Ruth Borgobello is an Australian-Italian film director and screenwriter. Her 2016 film The Space Between, starring Flavio Parenti and Maeve Dermody, was selected as the Australian entry for the Best Foreign Language Film at the 90th Academy Awards.

Selected filmography
 The Space Between (2016)

References

External links

Year of birth missing (living people)
Living people
Australian women film directors
Australian film directors
Australian women screenwriters
Italian women film directors
Italian women screenwriters
Italian screenwriters
Place of birth missing (living people)